Maryhill is a residential suburb of the New Zealand city of Dunedin. It is located on a ridge to the southwest of the central city between the suburbs of Mornington, Kenmure, and Caversham. The smaller suburb of Balaclava lies immediately to its west. Maryhill is believed to take its name from a district in the city of Glasgow in Scotland, where many of the early settlers of the suburb originated. In this regard it is unusual among Dunedin suburbs, many of which are named for suburbs of Edinburgh - Maryhill and the nearby Little Paisley are the only suburbs named for Glaswegian locations, and the latter is an old name rarely used today. A second theory is that Maryhill was named in honour of Mary, the wife of early Dunedin settler John Bathgate.

The main road in Maryhill is Glenpark Avenue, which runs south from a series of small streets which connect it with Mailer Street Mornington. At its southern end, it links with a tortuous zig-zag road, Lancefield Street, which leads to the suburb of Caversham. Several roads cross Glenpark Avenue; notable among them are Maryhill Terrace and Glen Road. These connect with Caversham at The Glen, in Maryhill's southwestern corner. Elgin Road, which runs parallel with Glenpark Avenue and lies at roughly the border of Maryhill, Mornington, and Kenmure, forms a major access road at Maryhill's western edge. This route links with Mailer Street and Kenmure Road at its northernmost point, and with Mornington Road at its southern end.

Little Paisley is an old name for an area close to the boundary of Maryhill and Mornington, between the top of Glen Road and Eglinton Road close to Dunedin Southern Cemetery. It gained this name in the early years of Dunedin's settlement, was settled by weavers from Paisley. The name is rarely used today.

Maryhill was connected from 1855 to 1955 to the Dunedin cable tramway system via the Maryhill Extension. The line, which followed Glenpark Avenue from Mornington, was perfectly straight, and was sometimes referred to as The Big Dipper because of its undulating course.

Maryhill's notable residents have included writer and publisher Sir Alfred Hamish Reed.

Balaclava
Balaclava, named for the Crimean War battle, is a small residential suburb lying close to the southern end of Elgin Road, and in the streets which branch off it. It is linked to Kenmure and the Kaikorai Valley by Barr Street, and with Lookout Point by Mornington Road.

Demographics

Maryhill had a population of 2,277 at the 2018 New Zealand census, an increase of 150 people (7.1%) since the 2013 census, and an increase of 45 people (2.0%) since the 2006 census. There were 909 households. There were 1,107 males and 1,170 females, giving a sex ratio of 0.95 males per female. The median age was 36.0 years (compared with 37.4 years nationally), with 453 people (19.9%) aged under 15 years, 492 (21.6%) aged 15 to 29, 1,074 (47.2%) aged 30 to 64, and 264 (11.6%) aged 65 or older.

Ethnicities were 84.8% European/Pākehā, 9.9% Māori, 5.7% Pacific peoples, 8.4% Asian, and 3.8% other ethnicities (totals add to more than 100% since people could identify with multiple ethnicities).

The proportion of people born overseas was 19.4%, compared with 27.1% nationally.

Although some people objected to giving their religion, 52.8% had no religion, 36.0% were Christian, 0.9% were Hindu, 0.8% were Muslim, 0.9% were Buddhist and 2.0% had other religions.

Of those at least 15 years old, 546 (29.9%) people had a bachelor or higher degree, and 234 (12.8%) people had no formal qualifications. The median income was $33,600, compared with $31,800 nationally. 276 people (15.1%) earned over $70,000 compared to 17.2% nationally. The employment status of those at least 15 was that 987 (54.1%) people were employed full-time, 291 (16.0%) were part-time, and 78 (4.3%) were unemployed.

Education
Balaclava School is a Catholic state-integrated contributing primary school serving years 1 to 6 with a roll of  students. It opened in 1964.

St Francis Xavier School is a Catholic state-integrated contributing primary school serving years 1 to 6 with a roll of  students. The school started in a church in 1919 and moved to its own building in 1929.

Both schools are coeducational. Rolls are as of

References

Suburbs of Dunedin